OSinform Information Agency is a South Ossetian news agency. It provides news coverage of political, economic, social, cultural, and sports events in South Ossetia and North Ossetia.

OSInform was founded by South Ossetian Television and Radio Broadcasting Company "IR" that is operated by South Ossetian State Committee for TV and Radio Broadcasting.

References

External links 
 

South Ossetia